Claudio Ubaldo Chena (born 27 July 1964) is an Argentine former football striker from the 1980s and early 1990s.

He played professionally for Colón de Santa Fe, Estudiantes de La Plata, Club Deportivo Morón, Central Córdoba (SdE) and Talleres de Córdoba in Argentina. He also made a spell in Bolivian football with Santa Cruz clubs Blooming and Oriente Petrolero.

External links
 Claudio Chena at BDFA.com.ar 

Argentine footballers
Association football forwards
Club Blooming players
Oriente Petrolero players
Club Atlético Colón footballers
Talleres de Córdoba footballers
Central Córdoba de Rosario footballers
Estudiantes de La Plata footballers
Expatriate footballers in Bolivia
1964 births
Living people
Deportivo Morón footballers
Argentine expatriate sportspeople in Bolivia
Footballers from Santa Fe, Argentina